John Ford, of Dorset, was an English lawyer and politician. He was a Member (MP) of the Parliament of England for Melcombe Regis in 1410, for Dorchester in 1417, 1419, 1420, May 1421, Dec. 1421, 1422 and 1423, and for Shaftesbury in 1426. Nothing is known of his family.

References

14th-century births
15th-century deaths
English MPs 1410
Members of the Parliament of England for Dorchester
English MPs 1417
English MPs 1419
English MPs 1420
English MPs May 1421
English MPs December 1421
English MPs 1422
English MPs 1423
English MPs 1426